Datuk Kamaruddin bin Taib (born 9 December 1957) is a Malaysian businessman who has been Non-Executive Chairman of HSBC Bank Malaysia since April 2022.

He is the son of Tan Sri Taib Andak. He holds a Bachelor of Science in mathematics from the University of Salford.

He was Executive Chairman of DNV Malaysia Sdn Bhd until June 2017. He is a former Chairman of Great Eastern Takaful, GHL Systems Bhd, Malaysia Pacific Corporation and HSBC Amanah Malaysia Bhd. He is currently a Director of Great Eastern General Insurance (Malaysia) Bhd, FIDE Forum, Fraser & Neave Holdings Bhd, Malaysia Smelting Corporation Bhd and RAM Holdings Bhd.

He was made a Commander of the Order of Meritorious Service (PJN) in 1997.

He was named in the Paradise Papers in 2017.

Honours
 :
 Commander of the Order of Meritorious Service (PJN) - Datuk (1997)

References

1957 births
Living people
Alumni of the University of Salford
People named in the Paradise Papers
Malaysian businesspeople
Malaysian people of Malay descent
Malaysian Muslims
Commanders of the Order of Meritorious Service